Doina Florica Ignat (1938 – 13 May 2016) was a Romanian politician. She was member of the Senate (1992–1996) for Bihor County, being named by the Romanian National Unity Party.

References

External links 
Doina Florica Ignat on Chamber of Deputies official site.

1938 births
2016 deaths
20th-century Romanian politicians
Members of the Senate of Romania
Romanian National Unity Party politicians